The  is an electric multiple unit (EMU) train type operated by the private railway operator Kintetsu Railway on Minami Osaka Line commuter services in Japan since 1974.

Design
Based on the earlier  trains, the 6200 series trains were built with air-conditioning from new. A total of 38 vehicles (five four-car sets and six three-car sets) were built between 1974 and 1978.

Formations
 the fleet consisted of five four-car sets and six three-car sets formed as follows.

Three-car sets
The three-car sets are formed as follows with two motored ("M" and "Mc") cars and one non-powered trailer ("T") car.

The "M" car has two pantographs.

Four-car sets
The four-car sets are formed as follows with two motored ("M" and "Mc") cars and two non-powered trailer ("T" and "Tc") cars.

The "M" car has two pantographs.

Interior

History

The first trains entered service in 1974.

In 2016, one three-car set was rebuilt to become the 16200 series Blue Symphony sightseeing train for use on the Minami Osaka and Yoshino Lines.

References

External links

 Kintetsu 6200 series information 

Electric multiple units of Japan
6200 series
Train-related introductions in 1975
Kinki Sharyo multiple units
1500 V DC multiple units of Japan

ja:近鉄6200系電車